Francesinha ( meaning Frenchie) is a Portuguese sandwich originally from Porto, made with bread, wet-cured ham, linguiça, fresh sausage like chipolata, steak or roast meat, and covered with melted cheese and a hot and thick spiced tomato and beer sauce. It is typically served with french fries.

History

Daniel David de Silva, a returned Portuguese emigrant from France and Belgium, tried to adapt the croque-monsieur to the Portuguese taste when he moved to Porto. He first made the sandwich with local meats and his special sauce in 1953 at 'A Regaleira''', a restaurant in Rua do Bonjardim, Porto; the francesinha quickly became a very popular dish and deeply associated with the city, although it can be found in many other places in Portugal. A classic francesinha meal would include the sandwich, surrounded on a bed of French fries doused in the famous sauce, and complemented with a fino, a draught beer.

Variations

There is no standard recipe for the francesinha. Different restaurants in Portugal have special variations, such as:

 Café Barcarola (Porto): Francesinha à Barcarola - A Francesinha Especial with prawns and shrimp;
 Café Ábaco (Porto): Francesinha de carne assada - A Francesinha Especial with roast pork;
 A Cascata (Porto): Francesinha à Cascata - A Francesinha Especial with mushrooms and cream;
 Restaurante Cunha (Porto): Francesinha à Cunha - Extremely large Francesinha.

The  (special francesinha) is a francesinha with egg and/or potato chips. Other variations of the original include fillings such as pork, chicken, pastrami, tuna, cod and vegetarian options.

Sauce
Francesinha sauce varies, with each establishment having its variation. The only common ingredient is beer. Most, though not all, sauces are tomato based and vary in their degree of spiciness. The color is usually red or orange. 

Regional variantsFrancesinha poveira is a form of francesinha distinctive to Póvoa de Varzim, north of Porto, created in the early 1960s. The poveira form uses different bread and sauce to form a sandwich that can be eaten by hand.Pica-pau is a breadless variant in which a steak is cut into bite-sized pieces and covered with sauce. The name pica-pau (woodpecker) references the traditional means of consumption with small skewers or toothpicks—making the diner "peck" at the dish.

 Reception The Daily Meal'' included the francesinha in their article "12 Life-Changing Sandwiches You've Never Heard Of".

See also

Croque-monsieur
Porto
Portuguese cuisine
 List of sandwiches

References

Further reading

External links

  Francesinhas - History of the Francesinha 
  Francesinha Póveira
  Irmandade da Francesinha - Ranking and evaluation of Francesinhas

Portuguese cuisine
Cheese sandwiches
Culture in Porto
Beef sandwiches
Cheese dishes
Egg dishes
Ham dishes
Sausage dishes
Pork sandwiches